Durban Harbour's Sir Albert of 1904 was a South African steam locomotive from the pre-Union era in the Natal Colony.

In 1904, the Harbours Department of the Natal Government placed a single  saddle-tank locomotive, named Sir Albert, in service as harbour shunting engine in Durban Harbour.

Port Advisory Board
In 1898, a Port Advisory Board was established in Durban, responsible for the management, control, improvement, development and maintenance of the facilities at Durban Harbour.

Railway operations in the harbour became the responsibility of the Harbours Department of the Government of Natal.

Manufacturer
In 1904, the Natal Harbours Department placed a single  saddle-tank locomotive in service at Durban Harbour. It was built by Hunslet Engine Company of Leeds and was numbered as well as named, after Sir Albert Henry Hime, Prime Minister of Natal from 1899 to 1903.

Service
According to some sources, Sir Albert was later renumbered to 46. It does not appear to have been taken onto the Natal Government Railways (NGR) roster.

When the Union of South Africa was established on 31 May 1910, the three Colonial government railways (Cape Government Railways, NGR and Central South African Railways) were united under a single administration to control and administer the railways, ports and harbours of the Union. Although the South African Railways and Harbours came into existence in 1910, the actual classification and renumbering of all the rolling stock of the three constituent railways were only implemented with effect from 1 January 1912.

Sir Albert was still in service at the harbour in 1912. Since the locomotive was considered obsolete, it was renumbered to 046 and not classified on the SAR. It kept on working at Durban Harbour until it was withdrawn from service in 1915.

References

0540
0540
0-6-0 locomotives
C locomotives
Hunslet locomotives
Cape gauge railway locomotives
Railway locomotives introduced in 1904
1904 in South Africa
Scrapped locomotives